"Hollywood Love" is a single by Canadian country music artist Carroll Baker. Released in 1980, it was the second single from her 1979 album Hollywood Love. The song reached number one on the RPM Country Tracks chart in Canada in August 1980.

Chart performance

References

1980 singles
Carroll Baker songs
RPM Country Tracks number-one singles of the year
1980 songs
RCA Records singles